Agnes Mortimer, Countess of Pembroke (1317 – 25 July 1368) was the wife of Laurence Hastings, 1st Earl of Pembroke. She was a daughter of Roger Mortimer, 1st Earl of March and Joan de Geneville, Baroness Geneville.

Family
Agnes Mortimer was one of the twelve children of Roger Mortimer, 1st Earl of March and Joan de Geneville, Baroness Geneville. Her paternal grandparents were Edmund Mortimer, 2nd Baron Mortimer and Margaret de Fiennes. Her maternal grandparents were Piers de Geneville, of Trim Castle and Ludlow, and Jeanne of Lusignan.

First marriage
Agnes' father had just been created Earl of March, and was thus able to look for more powerful spouses for his children. In a brilliant set of marriages, Agnes was therefore married to Laurence Hastings, 1st Earl of Pembroke, a ward of her father's, while her sister Beatrice was married to Edward of Norfolk. Edward II and Queen Isabella attended the wedding at Hereford; dates of this event vary by historian, and it has been speculated that it took place in late May or early June 1328, or in 1329. Agnes and Laurence had one surviving son, John Hastings, 2nd Earl of Pembroke, who was born in August 1347. Laurence died a year later.

Second marriage
After Laurence's death, Agnes married John de Hakelut. There were no known children from this marriage. Agnes died on 25 July 1368 and was buried at the Minoresses without Algate in London. She left a will that was dated 10 October 1367.

Ancestry

References

Works cited

 
 

|-

|-

1317 births
1368 deaths
Pembroke, Agnes
14th-century English people
14th-century English women
Daughters of British earls
Agnes Mortimer, Countess of Pembroke
Agnes